Serge Postigo (born November 14, 1968) is a Canadian actor.

Early life and education

Born in Agen, France, he moved to the Canadian province of Quebec during his childhood. He also lived in the Netherlands, Spain and Belgium for a short period. Immediately after his arrival in Canada, Postigo developed a strong interest in the theater industry. He obtained a diploma at the National Theatre School of Canada. Before finishing his studies, he started acting in 1990.

Career 
Postigo is one of the many actors in Quebec culture playing in several television shows and soap operas such as Watatatow, Urgence and 4 et demi in the 1990s. He also appeared in the 2005 film, Aurore, in which he played the role of Télesphore Gagnon, the father of Aurore Gagnon, a real life girl in the 1910s and 1920s who was abused and murdered by him and his cousin Marie-Anne Houde.

Postigo won back-to-back MetroStar awards in 1998 and 1999 for best Male Role for the TV show 4 et demi. He also won the MetroStar award of the year in 1999. He was also nominated for a Jutras Award for best supporting actor for Ma vie en cinemascope as well as several Gemini Awards during the 1990s.

Personal life

Postigo and his wife, Marina Orsini, have one son.

Filmography

Film

Television

External links
 
 

People from Agen
1968 births
Living people
Canadian male television actors
Canadian male film actors